Mickey O'Hagan is an American film, television, and voice over actress, known for the Showtime series Homeland and the feature film Tangerine, which premiered at the 2015 Sundance Film Festival and is known as one of the first films to be shot entirely on an iPhone.

Early life and education 
O'Hagan was born in New York City as Michael Adrienne O'Hagan, named after her father. Mickey was a childhood nickname she eventually used for her professional name. O'Hagan received her B.F.A. in Acting from Pace University, NYC.

Career 
O'Hagan began her career with radio and television voice overs, most notably the narrator of the ID Channel's series Stolen Voices, Buried Secrets. Her first television role was on the MTV series Warren The Ape, followed by film roles including the award-winning Starlet directed by Sean Baker and written by Baker and Chris Bergoch. O'Hagan re-teamed with Sean Baker and Chris Bergoch for her breakthrough role in Tangerine, playing a drug addicted prostitute for which she achieved positive critical notices for her performance. On the Showtime series Homeland she had a recurring role as Clarice. In 2018 she starred as a Margaret in the film Back At The Staircase which premiered at the Slamdance Film Festival. The same year she played Robert Mapplethorpe's assistant in the film Mapplethorpe, directed by Ondi Timoner which premiered at the Tribeca Film Festival. O'Hagan guest starred in the TNT miniseries I Am The Night in January 2019.

Filmography

Film

Television

References

External links 

Living people
American actresses
Year of birth missing (living people)
21st-century American women